Travis Wayne Childers (born March 29, 1958) is an American politician who served as the U.S. representative for  from 2008 to 2011. The district included much of the northern portion of the state including New Albany, Columbus, Oxford, Southaven, and Tupelo. A member of the Democratic Party, Childers previously served as Chancery Clerk of Prentiss County from 1992 until his election to Congress. On March 1, 2014, Childers announced that he was running for the United States Senate. He won his party's nomination for the Senate seat in the Democratic primary on June 3. He lost the general election to Republican incumbent Thad Cochran.

Early life, education and career
Childers was born in Booneville in Prentiss County, Mississippi, on March 29, 1958. He is the son of John Wayne and Betty (Stokes) Childers. His father, a native of Glen, died when Travis was 16 years old. In high school, Travis worked nights and weekends at a convenience store in Booneville to help his mother, Betty, and sister, Tammy.

Childers attended Northeast Mississippi Junior College and then the University of Mississippi, where he received his bachelor's degree in business administration in 1980.

While still a student at Ole Miss, Childers became licensed as a Real Estate Salesperson by the Mississippi Real Estate Commission (MREC) and became a realtor. After graduating from college, he joined Robert Davis' real estate business in Booneville and worked there throughout the 1980s.

Eventually he became licensed as a Real Estate Broker by MREC prior to his ownership of Travis Childers Realty & Associates, now Childers Realty and Associates, a Northeast Mississippi real estate firm.

Childers owns a personal care home, the Landmark Community, and the Landmark Nursing Center, an 80-bed skilled care facility and Alzheimer's unit.

In 1991, Childers was elected Prentiss County Chancery Clerk. He was elected five times (with 75 percent of the vote the final time). Childers was chosen to serve as President of the Mississippi Chancery Clerks Association for the 2001–2002 term.

In September, 2016, Travis Childers was awarded the Prentiss County Development Association 's "Doug Mansell Award", an annual award given to a person in Prentiss County who has contributed to the progress, betterment and development of Prentiss County and northeast Mississippi.

In October, 2016, Childers was inducted into the Northeast Mississippi Community College Hall of Fame.

U.S. House of Representatives

Committee assignments
Committee on Agriculture
Subcommittee on Department Operations, Oversight, Nutrition and Forestry
Subcommittee on General Farm Commodities and Risk Management
Committee on Financial Services
Subcommittee on Capital Markets, Insurance, and Government-Sponsored Enterprises
Subcommittee on Financial Institutions and Consumer Credit

Notable votes
In the 111th Congress, Childers voted for the American Recovery and Reinvestment Act and reauthorization of SCHIP. Childers opposed the 2009 American Clean Energy and Security Act. While Childers did vote against the Patient Protection and Affordable Care Act, he is against full repeal of the law. Childers stated that while he supports health care reform, he believes the bill needed changes. However, in his 2014 bid for Senate, he stated that the Patient Protection and Affordable Care Act is the law, and he supports it.

Political campaigns

2008

A special election in Mississippi's 1st congressional district was triggered when 12-year Republican incumbent Roger Wicker was appointed by Mississippi Governor Haley Barbour to the United States Senate seat vacated by Trent Lott.

Childers was endorsed by many prominent newspapers in the region: the Northeast Mississippi Daily Journal, the Commercial Dispatch, and the Commercial Appeal.

Several candidates qualified for the election. In the initial April 22 special election, Childers won 49.4 percent of the vote, falling just 400 votes short of the majority (50 percent plus one) needed to avoid a runoff. On May 13, Childers faced Republican candidate Greg Davis (who had won 46.3 percent on April 22). Childers won the runoff.

This election returned the district to the Democrats. The seat was held by Democrat Jamie Whitten of Charleston for 54 years, the longest tenure of any congressman until Michigan representative John Dingell passed the mark on February 11, 2009. Whitten retired in 1995 and was succeeded by Wicker. Childers' victory came as a major shock to the Republicans. The district has a decided conservative bent; Wicker had won his first race for the seat with 63 percent of the vote and had faced no serious opposition since then. The district has supported the official Democratic candidate for president only once since 1956; George W. Bush carried the district with 62 percent of the vote in 2004.

2008 general

Childers faced Greg Davis again in the general election on November 4, 2008. Childers defeated Davis 54% to 44%.

2010

Childers ran for re-election on November 2, 2010. He was challenged by Republican State Senator Alan Nunnelee (who held the state senate seat Wicker held before being elected to Congress), Constitutionalist Gail Giaramita, Libertarian Harold Taylor, Reformist Barbara Dale Washer, and Independent Wally Pang. Nunnelee defeated Childers, 55–41.

Proving just how Republican this district still was, no Democratic candidate in the district has won more than 40 percent of the vote since Childers left office.

2014 Senate election

Childers ran for the United States Senate in 2014.  His Republican opponent was incumbent Thad Cochran. Childers was endorsed by the Alliance for Retired Americans during his Senate campaign. Childers lost the election to Cochran on November 4, 2014.

Positions on issues
Childers identifies himself as a moderate Democrat. Childers supports increased funding for public education. He favored a swift withdrawal of American troops from Iraq. He is against privatization of Social Security and raising the age of retirement. Childers describes himself as pro-life and pro-gun, and he was endorsed by the National Right to Life Committee and the National Rifle Association in his 2010 reelection campaign. Childers said he supports job creation, increasing the minimum wage and is a strong advocate for public education. Childers supports tax breaks for small businesses that put people back to work, and ending tax breaks for companies that ship jobs to India and China. He supports equal pay for women, and increasing the minimum wage to a livable wage. Citing the national debt, Childers pledged to support a Balanced Budget Amendment. Childers has been described as a Blue Dog Democrat.

Personal life
Childers and his wife, Tami, have two children: Dustin, a recent graduate from Mississippi College School of Law practices law in the family's hometown.  Lauren, a graduate of the University of Mississippi is an employee of the University of Mississippi (Ole Miss).  Lauren Childers was Miss Ole Miss in the year 2010.  His wife Tami manages the family's healthcare businesses.  Travis Childers is a member of Booneville First United Methodist Church.

References

External links
Profile on his official campaign site
 

|-

|-

1958 births
American real estate businesspeople
Businesspeople from Mississippi
Democratic Party members of the United States House of Representatives from Mississippi
Living people
People from Booneville, Mississippi
Southern Baptists
University of Mississippi alumni
21st-century American politicians
Baptists from Mississippi
20th-century American businesspeople
21st-century American businesspeople